Nawwaf is a given name. Notable people with the name include:

 Nawaf al-Fares, Syrian diplomat
 Nawaf Al-Farshan (born 1998), Saudi Arabian football player
 Nawwaf Al-Hamzi (1976–2001), one of five hijackers of American Airlines Flight 77, which they crashed into the Pentagon as part of the September 11 attacks
 Nawwaf Moussawi (born 1965), Lebanese politician
 Nawwaf Fahd Humood Al-Otaibi, held in the United States' Guantanamo Bay detention camps at its naval base in Cuba since January 2002
 Nawwaf bin Talal Al Rashid (born 1989), Saudi-Qatari royal and poet
 Nawaf Al-Ahmad Al-Jaber Al-Sabah (born 1937), Emir of Kuwait 
 Nawaf Al-Sadi (born 2000), Saudi Arabian football player
 Nawwaf Salaam (born 1953), Lebanese diplomat, academic, and jurist
 Nawwaf bin Abdulaziz Al Saud (1932–2015), Saudi royal 
 Nawwaf bin Nayef Al Saud (born 1988), Saudi royal

See also
Nawaf